Brent Graydon Miskimmin (born 11 September 1956 in Christchurch) is a former field hockey player from New Zealand, who was a member of the national team that finished seventh at the 1984 Summer Olympics in Los Angeles, California. His two-year younger brother Peter was also on the side.

References
sports-reference

External links
 

New Zealand male field hockey players
Olympic field hockey players of New Zealand
Field hockey players at the 1984 Summer Olympics
Field hockey players from Christchurch
1956 births
Living people